"Christmas Tree Farm" is a Christmas song by American singer-songwriter Taylor Swift. It was produced by Swift and English musician Jimmy Napes. Swift wrote the song on December 1, 2019, inspired by her Christmas vacation, and released it four days later, on December 6. Opening with a classical balladic intro, "Christmas Tree Farm" is a cheery uptempo pop song driven by swing drums, lush orchestral arrangements, jingle bells, choir harmonies, and lyrics on childhood memories of Christmas.

The single charted in several countries, including Australia, Belgium, Canada, Hungary, Ireland, the United Kingdom, and the United States. Critics praised the song's festive production and lyrics. An official music video, a compilation of home videos that capture Swift's childhood days from the Christmas tree farm in Pennsylvania she grew up on, was also released alongside the song. The video features herself, her brother Austin Swift, and their parents. Swift performed the song live at the 2019 Capital FM Jingle Bell Ball in London and iHeartRadio Jingle Ball in New York City; the live version from the latter was released to digital music platforms in November 2020, followed by picture discs of the song. An "Old Timey Version" of the song, featuring a classical orchestra, has also been released.

Background and release
Taylor Swift released her seventh studio album, Lover, on August 23, 2019, to critical and commercial success. Inspired by the holiday season of 2019, "Christmas Tree Farm" was written, recorded, and released by Swift in under six days. She wrote the song during Thanksgiving weekend, and recorded it on December 1, 2019, the Sunday before its release, with English producer Jimmy Napes at London Lane Studios, United Kingdom. The day after that, a group of choral singers provided the finishing touches. The song was announced on Good Morning America on December 5, 2019, and released at midnight the same day, along with an accompanying music video made from home videos.

On November 22, 2021, Swift announced a re-recorded "Old Timey Version" of the song on Good Morning America. The song was released that same day as an Amazon Music exclusive, and was sent to contemporary hit radio on November 29, 2021; it was later released to all streaming platforms on November 23, 2022.

Composition

"Christmas Tree Farm" is an uptempo pop song. Swift wrote the song alone and produced it with Napes. The song runs for a duration of three minutes and forty-eight seconds. The song has two parts. After this, the main part of the song begins and takes on the uptempo swing feel in common time. Swift performs it in the key of G major with her vocals ranging between D to G. The lyrics are centered around the Christmas spirit, romance, family and nostalgia, especially Swift's years growing up at her father's Christmas tree farm as a child.

Critical reception

"Christmas Tree Farm" received positive reviews upon release. Varietys Chris Willman labeled the song "homey and hearth-y", with heavy orchestration and rich production, resulting in "maximum holiday glee". Alyssa Bailey of Elle described it an infectious pop song, but still a personal holiday track, with "jolly" and romantic lyrics. Writing for Elite Daily, Michel Mendez complimented Swift's songwriting, stating she is "one heck of a songwriter" and that the lyrics to the song "will make anyone feel nostalgic for holidays spent at home with family". Describing the song as romantic and nostalgic, Eric Hegedus of New York Post, opined that the "breezy" single serves as a enthusiastic love letter to a "soul mate who brings a sense of yearning to her [Swift's] heart."

Cosmopolitan picked "Christmas Tree Farm" as one of the 75 best Christmas songs of all time. Hollywood Life ranked it as the second best Christmas song from a celebrity, only behind Mariah Carey's "All I Want for Christmas Is You" (1994). American Songwriter ranked it at number one on its list of the five best underrated Christmas songs.

Commercial performance
In the United States, "Christmas Tree Farm" accumulated 7.7 million streams in its opening week. The song debuted at number two on the Billboard Digital Songs chart with 26,000 digital downloads sold. It was her 49th top-ten entry on the chart, an all-time record. It further arrived at number 59 on the Billboard Hot 100 chart, becoming Swift's 96th entry on the chart, which is the second highest tally for a female artist in the Hot 100 history, behind rapper Nicki Minaj; Swift surpassed Minaj eventually. It also debuted at number 25 and peaked at number three on the Billboard Adult Contemporary chart.

Elsewhere, the single landed at number 13 in Croatia, number 16 in Scotland, number 23 in Flanders, number 29 in Hungary, number 51 on the Irish Singles Chart, number 55 on the Canadian Hot 100, number 71 in the United Kingdom, and number 96 in Australia.

Bolstered by the 2020 Christmas season, the song re-entered the UK Singles Chart at number 95 in December 2020. "Christmas Tree Farm" also debuted at number 147 on the Billboard Global 200 chart, which was inaugurated in 2020. Following the release of the Old Timey Version, the single saw a boost in popularity in the 2021 Christmas season, where the song reached a new peak on the UK Single Chart at number 44 in December 2021.

Music video

The music video was directed and produced by Swift. The Christmas tree farm in the song title, on the cover art, and in the video is Pine Ridge Farm located in Cumru Township, Berks County, Pennsylvania, a place where Swift grew up as a child before moving to nearby Wyomissing, Pennsylvania and later Hendersonville, Tennessee. The video, which consists of home videos from Swift's childhood, features Swift, her brother Austin, and her parents Andrea and Scott. A lyric video for the song was released alongside the song and the music video on December 6, 2019. On December 23, a video about the making of the song was released.

Live performances
Swift performed the song for the first time on December 8, 2019 as part of her set-list for the 2019 Jingle Bell Ball in London. On December 13, Swift's birthday, she performed the song at iHeartRadio Z100's Jingle Ball in New York City. This performance was recorded and released digitally on December 19, 2020.

Credits and personnel
Credits are adapted from Tidal.

 Taylor Swift – vocals, songwriter, producer
 Jimmy Napes – producer, backing vocals, piano
 Serban Ghenea – mixer
 John Hanes – mix engineer
 Gus Pirelli – recording engineer, moog bass
 Jamie McEvoy – assistant recording engineer
 Joseph Wander – assistant recording engineer
 Will Purton – assistant recording engineer
 Camille – violin
 Bruce White – viola
 Jodi Milliner – bass guitar
 Ian Burdge – cello
 Chris Laurence – double bass
 Ash Soan – drums
 John Thurgood, Laurence Davies, Martin Owen – French horn
 Simon Hale – string arranger
 Lawrence Johnson – vocal arranger
 Canice-Mimi Otohwo, Destinee Knight-Scott, Glenn Tatenda Gwazai, Jessica Mae Obioha, Lorrain Briscoe, Margeaux Michelle, Paul Lee, Tarna Renae Johnson, Tehillah Daniel, The LJ Singers, Travis J Cole, Wayne Hernandez, Wendi Rose – backing vocals

Charts

Certifications

Release history

References

Footnote

Citations

2019 songs
2019 singles
Songs written by Taylor Swift
Taylor Swift songs
American Christmas songs
Republic Records singles
Song recordings produced by Taylor Swift
Music videos directed by Taylor Swift
Christmas tree production